Trigonaphera is a genus of sea snails, marine gastropod mollusks in the family Cancellariidae, the nutmeg snails.

Species
Species within the genus Trigonaphera include:
 Trigonaphera amakusana Petit, 1974
 Trigonaphera bocageana (Crosse & Debeaux, 1863)
 Trigonaphera dekkeri Verhecken, 2018
 Trigonaphera sinonippon Verhecken, 2018
 Trigonaphera stenomphala Habe, 1961
 Trigonaphera vinnulum (Iredale, 1925)
Species brought into synonymy
 Trigonaphera interlaevis Laseron, 1955: synonym of Trigonostoma bicolor (Hinds, 1843)
 Trigonaphera teramachii Habe, 1961: synonym of Nipponaphera teramachii (Habe, 1961)
 Trigonaphera tosaensis Habe, 1961: synonym of Mirandaphera tosaensis (Habe, 1961)
 Trigonaphera withrowi Petit, 1976: synonym of Trigonostoma scala (Gmelin, 1791)

References
Notes

Sources
 Petit, R.E. & Harasewych, M.G. (2005) Catalogue of the superfamily Cancellarioidea Forbes and Hanley, 1851 (Gastropoda: Prosobranchia)- 2nd edition. Zootaxa, 1102, 3-161. NIZT 682
 Hemmen, J. (2007). Recent Cancellariidae. Annotated and illustrated catalogue of Recent Cancellariidae. Privately published, Wiesbaden. 428 pp.

External links
 Iredale, T. (1936). Australian molluscan notes, no. 2. Records of the Australian Museum. 19(5): 267-340, pls 20-24

Cancellariidae